Under the Sun is the third studio album by Danish singer Ida Corr, released on 31 August 2009. On 27 April the first single "Time" was released in Denmark, Sweden, Finland and Norway. The album's second single, "I Want You" was released in Scandinavia on 10 August and in the German-speaking countries and Italy shortly after. The album was published under the label disco:wax under license from Lifted House, and distributed by Warner Music. The album's third single "Under the Sun", which features guest vocals by Shaggy, was released digitally worldwide in December.
In March 2011 the album was released in the German-speaking countries.

Track listing
All songs are written by Ida Corr except where stated.

Personnel
 Ida Corr – executive producer, backing vocals, instruments
 Christian von Staffeldt – producer, backing vocals, instruments
 Tracks 1, 3, 4, 7, 8, 11, 12: Lars Hartvig – saxophone, flute
 Saqib Hassan – mixing
 MusicMaster – mastering

Release history

References

External links
 Under the Sun at Discogs

Ida Corr albums
2009 albums